Thermistis is a genus of longhorn beetles of the subfamily Lamiinae, containing the following species:

 Thermistis croceocincta (Saunders, 1839)
 Thermistis nigromaculata Hua, 1990
 Thermistis rubromaculata Pu, 1984
 Thermistis sagittifera Pesarini & Sabbadini, 1999
 Thermistis sulphureonotata Pu, 1984
 Thermistis taiwanensis Nara & Yu, 1992
 Thermistis xanthomelas Holzschuh, 2007

References

Saperdini